Chung Laung Liu (1934 – 7 November 2020), also known as David Liu or C. L. Liu, was a Taiwanese computer scientist. Born in Guangzhou, he spent his childhood in Macau. He received his B.Sc. degree in Taiwan, master's degree and doctorate in United States.

Biography
Liu received his B.Sc. degree (1956) at the National Cheng Kung University in Taiwan, and his S.M. and E.E. degrees (1960), and his Sc. D. degree (1962) at the Massachusetts Institute of Technology. He was on the faculty of the Massachusetts Institute of Technology (1962–1972) and the University of Illinois at Urbana-Champaign (1972–1998), where he was Associate Provost from 1995 to 1998. He then retired from UIUC and served as President and Professor of Computer Science at the National Tsing Hua University (NTHU) in Hsinchu, Taiwan from February 1998 to February 2002. He was the William Mong Honorary Chair Professor at National Tsing Hua University. He was a Visiting Professor at City University of Hong Kong, and at Waseda University, Tokyo, Japan, and Li K. T. Honorary Chair Professor at National Central University. Since 2007 he was Li Kuo-Ting Forum Professor at National Cheng Kung University.

He was the author and co-author of seven books and monographs, and over 180 technical papers. His research interests included computer-aided design of VLSI circuits, real-time systems, computer-aided instruction, combinatorial optimization, and discrete mathematics.

He received the IEEE Millennium Medal, and the IEEE Circuits and Systems Society Golden Jubilee Medal in 2000. He also received the IEEE Computer Society, Real Time Systems Technical Committee 1999 Technical Achievement Award (inaugural winner) for his contributions in the area of real time scheduling, and the IEEE Circuits and Systems Society 1998 Technical Achievement Award for his contributions in the area of computer aided design of VLSI circuits. He received an Outstanding Talents Foundation Award in 1998. He was the recipient of the 1994 IEEE Education Medal. He also received the Taylor L. Booth Education Award from the IEEE Computer Society in 1992, and the inaugural winner of the Karl V. Karlstrom Education Award from the Association for Computing Machinery in 1989.

He was a member of Academia Sinica (elected 2000), a fellow of the Institute of Electrical and Electronics Engineers, and a fellow of the Association for Computing Machinery.

In 2004, the University of Macau awarded him an honorary doctorate.

Liu was married to Jane Liu, also a distinguished computer scientist and known for her work in real-time computing.
He died on 7 November 2020, aged 86, in Taipei.

Awards
2016: ACM SIGDA Pioneering Achievement Award
2014: IEEE Gustav Robert Kirchhoff Award
2011: Phil Kaufman Award, for technical and business contributions in Electronic design automation
2000: The Institute of Electrical and Electronics Engineers (IEEE) Millennium Medal, and the IEEE Circuits and Systems Society Golden Jubilee Medal
1999: The IEEE Computer Society, Real Time Systems Technical Committee 1999 Technical Achievement Award (inaugural winner) for his contributions in the area of real time scheduling,
1999: The IEEE Circuits and Systems Society 1998 Technical Achievement Award  for his contributions in the area of computer aided design of VLSI circuits.
1998: Outstanding Talents Foundation Award
1994: IEEE Education Medal and ACM Fellow.
1992: The Taylor L. Booth Education Award from the IEEE Computer Society
1989: Karl V. Karlstrom Outstanding Educator Award from the Association for Computing Machinery

See also
Important publications in cryptography

References

External links
C. L. Liu's students, from the ACM genealogy database.

1934 births
2020 deaths
Computer hardware researchers
Fellow Members of the IEEE
Fellows of the Association for Computing Machinery
Educators from Guangdong
Electronic design automation people
Macau people
Massachusetts Institute of Technology alumni
Members of Academia Sinica
National Cheng Kung University alumni
Academic staff of the National Cheng Kung University
Presidents of National Tsing Hua University
Scientists from Guangdong
Taiwanese computer scientists
Taiwanese educators
Taiwanese expatriates in the United States
Taiwanese people from Guangdong
University of Illinois Urbana-Champaign faculty
Taiwanese electrical engineers